The 2009 Prix de l'Arc de Triomphe was a horse race held at Longchamp on Sunday 4 October 2009. It was the 88th running of the Prix de l'Arc de Triomphe.

The winner was Sea the Stars, a three-year-old colt trained in Ireland by John Oxx. The winning jockey was Michael Kinane.

Sea the Stars became the first horse to win the 2,000 Guineas, the Epsom Derby and the Prix de l'Arc de Triomphe. It was his sixth consecutive Group 1 victory.

Race details
 Sponsor: Qatar Racing and Equestrian Club
 Purse: €4,000,000; First prize: €2,285,600 
 Going: Good
 Distance: 2,400 metres
 Number of runners: 19
 Winner's time: 2m 26.3s

Full result

 Abbreviations: dh = dead-heat; shd = short-head; hd = head; snk = short-neck

Winner's details
Further details of the winner, Sea the Stars.
 Sex: Colt
 Foaled: 6 April 2006
 Country: Ireland
 Sire: Cape Cross; Dam: Urban Sea (Miswaki)
 Owner: Christopher Tsui
 Breeder: Sunderland Holdings Ltd

References

External links
 Colour Chart – Arc 2009

Prix de l'Arc de Triomphe
 2009
Prix de l'Arc de Triomphe
Prix de l'Arc de Triomphe
Prix de l'Arc de Triomphe